This article deals with the conventions and uses of odonymy in France.

History 

It is possible to distinguish several eras where we observe a similar typology of street names on French territory:

Middle ages 
At the end of the 13th century, with the expansion and population of cities like Paris, the need is felt to separate the houses from each other. The names respond at this time to a functional logic. The name of the road is that of the place it serves, this place being religious ("place de l'Eglise", "rue des Capucins") or civil ("place du marché", "rue des Bouchers", often names in reference to the trades which are grouped together in a street which takes the name or "houses where the sign hangs"), and so on.

From 1600, on an idea of the Duke of Sully, the streets adopted names that had no direct connection with the designated place, while their name gradually became a public and royal monopoly: according to researcher Dominique Badariotti, the latter "is therefore exercised as best it can, functioning better in Paris than in the provinces and valuing the powerful of the kingdom or regional notables"

Statistics

Occurrences 
In 2016 in France, the following 15 odonyms are the most frequently cited on street maps.

Dates 
Several odonyms recalling important dates in the history of France also approach or exceed a thousand occurrences, if we combine the types of roads and the spelling variants; among others:

 19 March - End of the Algerian War
 8 May - Victory in Europe Day
 14 July - Bastille Day
 4 September - 4 September 1870, the date Napoleon III fell and the Third French Republic was proclaimed.
 11 November - Armistice of 11 November 1918

Terms 

 Cul de sac

References

See also 

 Street name

Street names
French culture